George William Kennedy  (12 March 1882 – 16 November 1917) was a Scottish footballer. He played at left half or centre half.

Career 
He began his career in his native Dumfries with Maxwelltown Volunteers.

He then made 45 appearances over two seasons playing for Lincoln City, making the move along with Norrie Fairgray and George Nisbet. Under David Calderhead, Lincoln pulled off an FA Cup upset when a goal by Fairgray knocked out Chelsea 1–0 in a replay. Calderhead became Chelsea manager soon after and took Fairgray with him. Kennedy followed a year later.

Kennedy spent the years in the lead up to World War I playing for another team in West London, then-Southern League club, Brentford. George left Brentford at the end of the 1912–13 season, returning to Dumfries for the following season.

Personal life 
George Kennedy emigrated to Canada in June 1914.

War service

Private 418239 G.W. Kennedy enlisted in the 42nd Battalion (Royal Highlanders Regiment) of the Canadian Infantry in March 1915 and was sent to France with the Canadian Expeditionary Force (CEF). He would subsequently be awarded both the Military Medal and Distinguished Conduct Medal for gallantry, and was also Mentioned in Despatches.

Having risen to the rank of Company Sergeant Major (CSM), Kennedy was wounded during the Third Battle of Ypres and subsequently died from his injuries on 16 November 1917. He was 35 years old.

CSM 418239 G. Kennedy is now buried at Lijssenthoek Military Cemetery, located 12 km west of Ypres close to the town of Poperinge.

Career statistics

References

1882 births
1917 deaths
Footballers from Dumfries
Scottish footballers
Association football wing halves
Lincoln City F.C. players
Chelsea F.C. players
Brentford F.C. players
English Football League players
Southern Football League players
Place of death missing
Canadian Expeditionary Force soldiers
Canadian military personnel killed in World War I
Scottish emigrants to Canada
Canadian recipients of the Distinguished Conduct Medal
Canadian recipients of the Military Medal
Burials at Lijssenthoek Military Cemetery